St. Francis de Sales School, also known as Francis de Sales or SFS, is a co-educational private English Medium school in Dhemaji, Assam.  Privately funded and independent, it was  founded in 1979, by Fr Verketh Veliadeth. The school is a recognized Christian minority private institution run by the Missionaries of St. Francis de Sales and affiliated to the Board of Secondary Education, Assam (SEBA)
.The school also topped the list of schools in Assam particularly Dhemaji for its academic excellence .

References

Sources
Konwar, Chuchen, Gohain, Narendra Nath; Doley, Dimbeswar;  Golden Rainbow 2004 Edition, The annual School magazine of S.F.S School,

Educational institutions established in 1979
Dhemaji
Christian schools in Assam
1979 establishments in Assam